Digitivalva exsuccella is a moth of the family Acrolepiidae. It was described by Nikolay Grigoryevich Erschoff in 1874. It was described from Uzbekistan.

References

Moths described in 1874
Acrolepiidae